Michélle Botes (born 12 October 1962), is a South African actress, language instructor, designer and aromatherapist. She is best known for her roles in the television soapies Legacy (2020), Isidingo (1998) and Arende (1994).

Personal life
Botes was born on 12 October 1962 in Cape Town, South Africa. She completed high school in Cape Town, then graduated with a Bachelor's degree in speech and drama (bilingual) from the University of Stellenbosch. After graduation, she completed a diploma in education at the University of Cape Town.

Career
In 1998, she joined the cast of SABC3 soap opera Isidingo and played the role "Cherel de Villiers Haines" for nine consecutive years until 2007, but rejoined in 2009. In 2002, she was included for the Top 10 Celebrities in Television by the magazine Star. In 2006, she won two awards: Best Actress and Best Onscreen Villain at the nineteenth annual Avanti Awards. Meanwhile, she also received the award for the Best TV Couple in Isidingo along with Barkes Haines and Robert Whitehead at the Crystal Awards. She was nominated for Best Actress in TV Soap category at the South African Film and Television Awards (SAFTA) for three years: 2006, 2007 and 2012.

In 2019, she rejoined with Binnelanders. In 2020, she joined the telenovela Legacy and played the role of Angelique Price. For her role, she won the SAFTA Golden Horn Award for Best Supporting Actress in the Telenovela category.

Filmography

References

External links
 

Living people
South African film actresses
South African television actresses
1962 births
University of Cape Town alumni